Harriette Underhill (1877-1928) was an American film critic for the New-York Tribune and its successor the New York Herald Tribune.  She was the most prominent American female film critic of the silent film era.Slide, Anthony. Inside the Hollywood Fan Magazine, p. 40 (2010).

Biography
Underhill was born in Troy, New York and came to New York City not long after marrying (at age 16 according to older reports of her life).  She then played minor parts in some theatre productions, including in the original chorus for the popular musical Florodora.  Her father Lorenzo Underhill was a sportswriter, and she turned to journalism after his death, taking over her father's sports column at the New-York Tribune in 1908, first writing about horse and dog shows.  Sometime after seeing her first movie, The Coward (1915), she asked to start writing film reviews.  This was when films were first starting to get reviews in newspapers.Callender, Agnes (9 May 1925). Turning the Tables on Harriette Underhill, Brooklyn Life  She also wrote for film and general magazines.

Underhill was severely injured in 1919 when she was hit by a car, but continued to write.  She succeeded to Virginia Tracy's film column at the Tribune.   She died at her home in Manhattan on May 18, 1928, after a month long illness, though she continued to write until the day she died, even dictating copy to her doctor and nurse.  

Film scholar Richard Abel, writing in 2020 for the Women Film Pioneer Project at Columbia University, described Underhill as a "a perceptive, intelligent film critic and a compelling stylist."   Her sway in Hollywood was apparent from the fact that numerous stars visited her in her final illness.

In 1923, Screenland magazine canvassed top film critics to identify the ten best movies ever made.  Every critic except Underhill included The Birth of a Nation (which was already controversial at the time of its release) in their list.(November 1923). The Ten Best Screen Dramas, Screenland, p. 45 (in the next issue of the magazine, Alison Smith of the New York Evening Mail included the movie on her list but "with reservations").  Of director D. W. Griffith, she once said he "is the most uneven director; some of his pictures are good and some are terrible."

Personal
Underhill was married and divorced thrice per her obituary.Ross, Ishbel. Ladies of the Press, pp. 412 (1936)  In a 1925 interview she said "I've been married thousands of times, perhaps because I've always loved anything with an element of chance or danger."(July 1925). Inside Life Stories of Photoplay Staff Writers, Photoplay, p. 55.

References

External links
 Harriette Underhill as the Women Film Pioneers Project (Columbia University)
 Harriette Underhill reviews compilation at Rotten Tomatoes

1877 births
1928 deaths
American theater critics
New York Herald Tribune people
New York Herald people
Women film pioneers